This is a list of Canadian films slated for release in 2023:

See also
 2023 in Canadian television

References

External links
Feature Films Released In 2023 With Country of Origin Canada at IMDb

2022

Canada